Liara may refer to:
 Liara (katydid), a katydid genus in the tribe Agraeciini
 Liara T'Soni, a character from the Mass Effect media franchise
 Liara Roux, American activist, author and sex worker